Andrea Sinkó (born February 14, 1967, in Budapest) is a retired Hungarian rhythmic gymnast.

She competed for Hungary in the rhythmic gymnastics all-around competition at the 1988 Olympic Games in Seoul. She was 5th in the qualification and advanced to the final, placing 6th overall.

References

External links 
 Andrea Sinkó at Sports-Reference.com

1967 births
Living people
Hungarian rhythmic gymnasts
Gymnasts at the 1988 Summer Olympics
Olympic gymnasts of Hungary
Gymnasts from Budapest